Urich may refer to
Urich, Missouri, a town in the United States
Urich (surname)
Urich's tyrannulet, a bird endemic to Venezuela